The Norway Rock Festival, formerly known as the Kvinesdal Rock Festival, is a rock and metal festival held annually in Kvinesdal, Norway since 2006. The 2007 edition took place between 12 and 15 July. At the 2008 festival, two people were found dead near to a bus. Initial reports suspect carbon monoxide poisoning as being the cause of death. The 2009 edition took place between 9 and 12 July.
The 2010 edition took place between 7 and 11 July.

The festival is known for its bright atmosphere and a phenomenal festival camp near the festival area. The Norway Rock Festival is unofficially known as "Norway's response to Woodstock", "Norway's best rock festival" and "the summer's most beautiful festival adventure" by the press and the audience who return year after year to experience the festival's peculiar rock soul where freedom, independence and pure love of proper music permeates every inch of the area.

Lineups

2018
Nightwish

2011
Headlining: Alice Cooper, Volbeat, In Flames

Other performing acts:
Black Label Society
The Darkness
Edguy
U.D.O.
Blind Guardian
Kvelertak
TNT
Keep of Kalessin
Cancer Bats
Pagan's Mind
Mercenary
Luxus Leverpostei
Ingenting
The Quireboys
Black Ingvars
Crucified Barbara
Blood Command
Insense
Saint Deamon
Djerv
Guardians of Time
Breed
Mongo Ninja
Heatseekers
Ozzmosis
Trendkill
Powerride
Metallicatz
Teardown

2010
Headlining: Twisted Sister, Slash, Gary Moore, Sebastian Bach

Other performing acts:
Epica
Enslaved
Motörhead
Megadeth
Immortal
Kamelot
Queensrÿche
Killswitch Engage
U.D.O.
Airbourne
Cavalera Conspiracy
DevilDriver
Amon Amarth
Jorn
Bullet for My Valentine
Saxon
Anvil
Over the Rainbow
Sabaton
Audrey Horne
Gamma Ray
Crashdïet
Tony Harnell
Sybreed
Purified in Blood
Backstreet Girls
Rammsund (Rammstein cover band)

2009
Manowar
Nightwish
In Flames
Sonata Arctica
Arch Enemy
Zerozonic
HolyHell
W.A.S.P.
Testament
Mustasch
K[Nine]
Thunderbolt
Backyard Babies
Doro
U.D.O.
Satyricon
Skambankt
Sahg
Sirenia
Sister Sin

2008
Alice Cooper
Motörhead
The Quireboys
Hardcore Superstar
Turbonegro (canceled at the last minute as a mark of respect to the people who died earlier in the day)
Volbeat
Hayseed Dixie
Helloween
The Ark
K[Nine]

2007
Sebastian Bach
D-A-D
TNT
Kamelot
Jorn
Sabaton
Freak Kitchen
Skambankt
The Cumshots
Carburetors
Paperback Freud
Lowdown
Circus Maximus
Crucified Barbara
Communic
Wig Wam

References

External links

2006 establishments in Norway
Kvinesdal
Music festivals established in 2006
Rock festivals in Norway